Harun Kola (also Romanized as Hārūn Kolā; also known as Hārūn Kolā-ye Bālā and Hārūn Kolā-ye ‘Olyā) is a village in Dasht-e Sar Rural District, Dabudasht District, Amol County, Mazandaran Province, Iran. At the 2006 census, its population was 937, in 255 families.

References 

Populated places in Amol County